Jean Elizabeth Hampton (June 1, 1954 – April 2, 1996) was an American political philosopher, author of Hobbes and the Social Contract Tradition, Political Philosophy, The Authority of Reason, The Intrinsic Worth of Persons and, with Jeffrie G Murphy, Forgiveness and Mercy.

Work 
She subscribed to the "moral education" theory of punishment, where the goal is to first educate the criminal and then secondly educate society about the morally wrong action that has been done by the criminal. This theory does not condone 'pain' inflicted punishment, nor does it believe that incarceration is always the answer. The theory states that all criminals, even if they have wronged society, are still due the autonomous rights guaranteed them by the state, and it is the state's duty to uphold the moral education of the criminal the best way that it can.

She later supported the expressive theory of retribution (see her article "An Expressive Theory of Retribution" from Retributivism and Its Critics, ed. Wesley Cragg. Franz Steiner, 1992).

Hampton was on sabbatical in Paris with her husband, Richard Healey, a University of Arizona philosophy professor, when she suffered a cerebral hemorrhage March 29, 1996. She died three days later as a result of complications from that hemorrhage. She was 41.

Selected bibliography

Books

Book chapters

See also
 American philosophy
 List of American philosophers

Notes

External links 
 Jean Elizabeth Hampton - memorial in the Proceedings and Addresses of the APA.

1954 births
1996 deaths
20th-century American philosophers
Political philosophers
Harvard University alumni
University of California, Los Angeles faculty
University of Pittsburgh alumni
Wellesley College alumni